Javier García Cuesta (born April 20, 1947 in Mieres) is a retired handball coach and former Spanish handball player who competed in the 1972 Summer Olympics.

In 1972, he was part of the Spanish team which finished 15th in the Olympic tournament. He played two matches and scored one goal.

Javier Garcia worked as  the Team Handball Coach of the Brazilian National Team.
He held the position of head coach for the United States men's national handball team from 2014 until 2018, when he was replaced by Robert Hedin.

References

1947 births
Living people
People from Mieres, Asturias
Spanish male handball players
Olympic handball players of Spain
Handball players at the 1972 Summer Olympics
Sportspeople from Asturias